In mathematics, the Leibniz formula for , named after Gottfried Leibniz, states that

an alternating series. It is sometimes called the Madhava–Leibniz series as it was first discovered by the Indian mathematician Madhava of Sangamagrama or his followers in the 14th–15th century (see Madhava series), and was later independently rediscovered by James Gregory in 1671 and Leibniz in 1673. The Taylor series for the inverse tangent function, often called Gregory's series, is:
 

The Leibniz formula is the special case 

Proofs

Proof 1 

Considering only the integral in the last term, we have:

Proof 2 
Let , when , the series  to be converges uniformly, then 

Therefore, if  approaches  so that it is continuous and converges uniformly, the proof is complete, where, the series  to be converges by the Leibniz's test, and also,  approaches  from within the Stolz angle, so from Abel's theorem this is correct.

Convergence 

Leibniz's formula converges extremely slowly: it exhibits sublinear convergence. To get 4 correct decimal places (error of 0.00005) one needs 5000 terms. Even better than Calabrese or Johnsonbaugh error bounds are available.

However, the Leibniz formula can be used to calculate  to high precision (hundreds of digits or more) using various convergence acceleration techniques. For example, the Shanks transformation, Euler transform or Van Wijngaarden transformation, which are general methods for alternating series, can be applied effectively to the partial sums of the Leibniz series. Further, combining terms pairwise gives the non-alternating series

which can be evaluated to high precision from a small number of terms using Richardson extrapolation or the Euler–Maclaurin formula. This series can also be transformed into an integral by means of the Abel–Plana formula and evaluated using techniques for numerical integration.

Unusual behaviour 
For example, taking five million terms yields

where the underlined digits are wrong. The errors can in fact be predicted; they are generated by the Euler numbers  according to the asymptotic formula

where  is an integer divisible by 4. If  is chosen to be a power of ten, each term in the right sum becomes a finite decimal fraction. The formula is a special case of the Boole summation formula for alternating series, providing yet another example of a convergence acceleration technique that can be applied to the Leibniz series. In 1992, Jonathan Borwein and Mark Limber used the first thousand Euler numbers to calculate  to 5,263 decimal places with the Leibniz formula.

Euler product
The Leibniz formula can be interpreted as a Dirichlet series using the unique non-principal Dirichlet character modulo 4. As with other Dirichlet series, this allows the infinite sum to be converted to an infinite product with one term for each prime number. Such a product is called an Euler product. It is:

In this product, each term is a superparticular ratio, each numerator is an odd prime number, and each denominator is the nearest multiple of 4 to the numerator.

See also
List of formulae involving

References

External links
 Leibniz Formula in C, x86 FPU Assembly, x86-64 SSE3 Assembly, and DEC Alpha Assembly

Pi algorithms
Articles containing proofs
Gottfried Wilhelm Leibniz
Mathematical series